The Charles F. Ranzow and Sons Building is a historic building located on Lot 1, Block 18 of the original town of Davenport, Iowa, United States.   It is part of the West Third Street Historic District, which was added to the National Register of Historic Places in 1983.  The building was individually listed on the Davenport Register of Historic Properties in 2000.

History
Charles F. Ranzow owned the site by 1864 when he built a building on the site.  The Sanborn Fire Insurance maps of 1886, 1892 and 1910 suggest the western two-thirds of the building was constructed by 1886 and the eastern third of the building was built between 1892 and 1910.  The Ranzow Paint Company occupied the site for over 100 years.  Wallpaper, paints, and oils were sold in the western section, and the eastern part functioned as a sash and door warehouse.  The building currently houses the River Cities' Reader and AdMospheres, an advertising agency.

Architecture
The building is a two-story free standing brick structure with a brick foundation.  It features an overhanging bracketed metal cornice and a centralized broken pediment above.  The windows on the second floor have stone lintels with keystones.  The two original storefronts are indicated by iron columns.  Access to the second floor is located between the two storefronts.  The different coloration of the brick on the main façade of the building differentiates the two sections of the building.

References

Historic district contributing properties in Iowa
Commercial architecture in Iowa
Buildings and structures in Davenport, Iowa
Davenport Register of Historic Properties
National Register of Historic Places in Davenport, Iowa